Esko Lähtevänoja (born 14 May 1953 in Utajärvi) is a Finnish former cross-country skier who competed in the 1970s. He earned a silver medal in the 4 × 10 km relay at the 1978 FIS Nordic World Ski Championships in Lahti.

Cross-country skiing results

World Championships
 1 medal – (1 silver)

External links
 World Championship results 

Finnish male cross-country skiers
Living people
1953 births
FIS Nordic World Ski Championships medalists in cross-country skiing
People from Utajärvi
Sportspeople from North Ostrobothnia
20th-century Finnish people